The 2020 New England Revolution II season is the inaugural season in the soccer team's history, where they compete in the third division of American soccer, USL League One. New England Revolution II, as a child club of New England Revolution of Major League Soccer, are barred from participating in the 2020 U.S. Open Cup. New England Revolution II play their home games at Gillette Stadium, located in Foxborough, Massachusetts, United States.

Club

Roster 
As of March 3, 2020.

Coaching staff

Competitions

Exhibitions

USL League One

Standings

Results summary

Results by round

Match results

References

External links

New England Revolution II
New England Revolution II
New England Revolution II
New England Revolution II